The Men's Overall in the 2019 FIS Alpine Skiing World Cup involved 38 events in 5 disciplines: downhill (DH), Super-G (SG), giant slalom (GS), slalom (SL), and Alpine combined (AC). Marcel Hirscher of Austria won the overall title for the eighth consecutive time, setting the all-time record, as no one prior had ever won more than six total. After the season, Hirscher retired.

The season was interrupted by the 2019 World Ski Championships, which were held from 4–17 February in Åre, Sweden.

Standings

See also
 2019 Alpine Skiing World Cup – Men's summary rankings
 2019 Alpine Skiing World Cup – Men's Downhill
 2019 Alpine Skiing World Cup – Men's Super-G
 2019 Alpine Skiing World Cup – Men's Giant Slalom
 2019 Alpine Skiing World Cup – Men's Slalom
 2019 Alpine Skiing World Cup – Men's Combined
 2019 Alpine Skiing World Cup – Women's Overall

References

External links
 Alpine Skiing at FIS website

Men's Overall
FIS Alpine Ski World Cup overall titles